East Lothian is one of the 32 council areas of Scotland, as well as a historic county, registration county and lieutenancy area. The county was called Haddingtonshire until 1921.

In 1975, the historic county was incorporated for local government purposes into Lothian Region as East Lothian District, with some slight alterations of its boundaries. The Local Government etc. (Scotland) Act 1994 later created East Lothian as one of 32 modern council areas. East Lothian lies south of the Firth of Forth in the eastern central Lowlands of Scotland. It borders Edinburgh to the west, Midlothian to the south-west and the Scottish Borders to the south. Its administrative centre and former county town is Haddington while the largest town is Musselburgh.

Haddingtonshire has ancient origins and is named in a charter of 1139 as Hadintunschira and in another of 1141 as Hadintunshire. Three of the county's towns were designated as royal burghs: Haddington, Dunbar, and North Berwick.

As with the rest of Lothian, it formed part of the Anglo-Saxon kingdom of Bernicia and later the Kingdom of Northumbria. Popular legend suggests that it was at a battle between the Picts and Angles in the East Lothian village of Athelstaneford in 823 that the flag of Scotland was conceived. From the 10th century, Lothian transferred from the Kingdom of England to the authority of the monarchs of Scotland. It was a cross-point in battles between England and Scotland and later the site of a significant Jacobite victory against Government forces in the Battle of Prestonpans. In the 19th century, the county is mentioned in the Gazetteer for Scotland as chiefly agricultural, with farming, fishing and coal-mining forming significant parts of the local economy.

History

Early history

Following the end of the Roman occupation of Britain, Lothian was populated by Brythonic-speaking Ancient Britons and formed part of the kingdom of the Gododdin, within the Hen Ogledd or Old North. In the 7th century, all of the Gododdin's territory fell to the Angles, with Lothian becoming part of the kingdom of Bernicia.

Bernicia united into the Kingdom of Northumbria which itself became part of the early Kingdom of England. Lothian came under the control of the Scottish monarchy in the 10th century.

The earliest reference to the shire of Haddington, or Haddingtonshire, occurred in the 12th century, in two charters issued by King David. The shire covered the eastern part of Lothian.

Medieval and early modern period

Haddingtonshire was heavily involved in several medieval and early modern conflicts and several fortified castles and buildings such as Dunbar Castle, Tantallon Castle and Dirleton Castle date from this period.

In the 12th and 13th centuries, the Palace of Haddington was one of the seats of the Kings of Scotland. King William the Lion of Scotland used the palace from time to time and it was the birthplace of Alexander II in 1198. The palace and town were burned and pillaged in 1216, by an English army under the command of King John of England. In 1296, the Battle of Dunbar was a decisive victory for the forces of Edward I of England against the forces of John Balliol, the Scottish king who was Edward's vassal.

Haddingtonshire was also the site of conflict during the war of the Rough Wooing, with many houses and villages burnt by the English in May 1544 after the sacking of Edinburgh, the Scottish defeat at the battle of Pinkie, Dunbar Castle burnt in 1548, and the siege of Haddington. Haddingtonshire lairds supported the English cause, including John Cockburn of Ormiston, Alexander Crichton of Brunstane, and Regent Arran demolished their houses.

During the War of the Three Kingdoms, another Battle of Dunbar took place in 1650 between Scottish Covenanter forces and the Parliamentary forces under Oliver Cromwell. The Parliamentary forces were victorious and able to march on to take Edinburgh.

Following the Restoration of the monarchy, Glorious Revolution and Acts of Union, Jacobite forces conflicted with Government forces, with the main conflict taking place as part of the 1715 Rising and 1745 Rising. Under the command of Sir John Cope, the British Army met with the Jacobites under Charles Edward Stuart at the Battle of Prestonpans in the west of the county in September 1745, with the Jacobite side gaining a significant victory before being defeated at the Battle of Culloden in April 1746.

Modern history

Haddingtonshire County Council was created in 1890 under the Local Government (Scotland) Act 1889, which established elected county councils across Scotland, taking over most of the functions of the Commissioners of Supply, which had been the main administrative body of the shire since 1667. The county council was based at County Buildings in Court Street, Haddington, which had been built in 1833 and also served as the county's sheriff court.

In April 1921 the county council voted to request a change of the county's name from Haddingtonshire to "East Lothian". The government agreed and brought the change into effect as part of the East Lothian County Buildings Order Confirmation Act 1921, which received royal assent on 8 November 1921. The act also transferred ownership of the County Buildings to the county council.

In 1975 under the Local Government (Scotland) Act 1973, Scotland's county councils were dissolved and a new system of regional and district councils was created. East Lothian District was created within the wider Lothian region. The district comprised the historic county of East Lothian plus the burgh of Musselburgh and the parish of Inveresk (which included Wallyford and Whitecraig) from the county of Midlothian.

When further reforms in 1996 moved Scotland to a system of 32 unitary local authorities, the modern council area of East Lothian was created.

Geography 
East Lothian is predominantly rural. It has  of coastline where the towns of Musselburgh, Prestonpans, Cockenzie and Port Seton, Gullane, North Berwick and Dunbar lie along the coast of the Firth of Forth. The coast has several headlands and bays, most notably Gosford Bay, Aberlady Bay, Gullane Point, Sandy Hirst, Tyne Mouth, Belhaven Bay, Barns Ness, Chapel Point and Torness Point. There are several small islands off the coast north of North Berwick, the largest of these being Fidra, Lamb, Craigleith and Bass Rock.

Only two towns are landlocked, Tranent and Haddington. The River Tyne flows through Haddington and several of East Lothian's villages, reaching the Firth of Forth near Belhaven. The River Esk flows through Inveresk and Musselburgh where it empties at the north of the town into the Firth of Forth. Major bodies of water include Pressmennan Lake, the Whiteadder Reservoir, Hopes Reservoir, Stobshiel Reservoir and Lammerloch Reservoir.

Transport

Road 

The A1 road travels through East Lothian where it meets the Scottish Borders southbound and Edinburgh northbound. The A1 throughout East Lothian is dual carriageway and major junctions include Dunbar, Haddington, Tranent, Prestonpans and Musselburgh.

Starting in Leith, the A199 road also travels through East Lothian beginning at Musselburgh and passing through Wallyford, Tranent, Macmerry and Haddington before joining the A1 in West Barns.

Some non-primary routes in East Lothian are the A198, A1087, A6093 and A6137 roads.

Public transport 

East Lothian is served by seven railway stations: Dunbar and Musselburgh on the East Coast Main Line; and North Berwick, Drem, Longniddry, Prestonpans and Wallyford on the North Berwick Line. Rail service operators which travel through and stop at stations in the area include: ScotRail on both lines; and CrossCountry and London North Eastern Railway on the East Coast Main Line.

Bus operators in East Lothian are: Lothian Buses and its subsidiary East Coast Buses, Eve Coaches of Dunbar, Prentice of Haddington and Borders Buses. East Coast Buses is the main bus service provider connecting the towns and villages of East Lothian to Edinburgh. The company has depots in North Berwick and Musselburgh.

Demography 
The population of East Lothian as of 2019 is 105,790. This is an increase of over 6,000 since 2011 and this is projected to reach over 120,000 by the 2030s. The fastest growing district in East Lothian is the Tranent, Wallyford and Macmerry ward which is expected to see its population of just over 20,000 increase to just under 30,000 by 2026.

Ethnicity 
Population by major ethnic group in East Lothian according to the 2011 Scottish census is as follows:

Politics 
In the 2014 Scottish independence referendum, a majority of voters in the East Lothian council area opted for Scotland to remain a part of the United Kingdom - with 61.72% casting their ballots for the Union and 38.28% voting for independence.

Parliament of the United Kingdom 
East Lothian is a constituency in the House of Commons, electing one Member of Parliament. It is one of only 4 UK Parliamentary Constituencies in Scotland which matches the boundaries of its Local Authority area. The other examples being Inverclyde, Moray, and Na h-Eileanan an Iar, East Lothian is one of the few UK Parliamentary Constituencies which fully covers the boundaries of its Council area.

The current MP for East Lothian is Kenny MacAskill of the Alba Party, who has represented the constituency since the 2019 general election when he was elected for the SNP.

Former UK Prime Minister Arthur Balfour was born on 25 July 1848 at Whittingehame House in what is now the East Lothian constituency.

Scottish Parliament 
Most of East Lothian is in the East Lothian Scottish Parliament constituency and South Scotland region with the exception of Musselburgh which is in Midlothian North and Musselburgh and the Lothians region.

Local government 
East Lothian Council is based in the historic county town of Haddington, with the council meeting at the Haddington Town House and offices at nearby at John Muir House. The unitary local authority contains six wards, electing 22 councillors.

Places of interest

 Aberlady Bay
 Bass Rock
 Dirleton Castle
 Dunglass Collegiate Church
 Fa'side Castle
 Fenton Barns Retail & Leisure Village
 Hailes Castle
 Hopetoun Monument
 Lennoxlove historic house
 Longniddry Bents
 Muirfield Golf Links
 Museum of Flight, East Fortune
 North Berwick Harbour
 North Berwick Law
 Preston Mill
 Prestongrange Industrial Heritage Museum
 Scottish Seabird Centre, North Berwick
 Seacliff Beach
 Seton Collegiate Church
 Tantallon Castle
 Chesters Hill Fort
 Torness Nuclear Power Station
 Traprain Law
 Yellowcraigs, a beach and conservation area

Towns and villages

 Aberlady
 Athelstaneford
 Auldhame
 Ballencrieff
 Bara
 Belhaven
 Biel
 Bilsdean
 Bolton
 Broxburn
 Canty Bay
 Cockenzie
 Dirleton
 Drem
 Dunbar
 Dunglass
 East Fortune
 East Linton
 East Saltoun
 Elphinstone
 Fenton Barns
 Fisherrow (historically within Midlothian)
 Garvald
 Gifford
 Gladsmuir
 Glenkinchie
 Gullane
 Haddington
 Humbie
 Innerwick
 Inveresk (historically within Midlothian)
 Kingston
 Longniddry
 Luffness
 Macmerry
 Markle
 Monktonhall (historically within Midlothian)
 Musselburgh (historically within Midlothian)
 North Berwick
 Oldhamstocks
 Ormiston
 Peaston
 Pencaitland
 Phantassie
 Port Seton
 Preston
 Prestonpans
 Samuelston
 Scoughall
 Spittal
 Spott
 Stenton
 Tranent
 Tyninghame
 Wallyford (historically within Midlothian)
 West Barns
 West Saltoun
 Whitecraig (historically within Midlothian)
 Whitekirk and Tyninghame
 Whittingehame

Civil parishes

In 1894, John Martine published Reminiscences and Notices of Ten Parishes of the County of Haddington.

 Aberlady
 Athelstaneford
 Bolton
 Dirleton
 Dunbar
 Garvald
 Gladsmuir
 Haddington
 Humbie
 Innerwick
 Morham
 North Berwick
 Oldhamstocks
 Ormiston
 Pencaitland
 Prestonkirk
 Prestonpans
 Saltoun
 Spott
 Stenton
 Tranent
 Whittingehame
 Whitekirk and Tyninghame
 Yester

Education

There are a range of schools in the county, including six state secondaries: Dunbar Grammar School, Knox Academy (formerly the Grammar School) in Haddington, Musselburgh Grammar School, North Berwick High School, Preston Lodge High School in Prestonpans and Ross High School in Tranent.

There are two independent schools in the county. Loretto School is a day and boarding school in Musselburgh founded in 1827 and Belhaven Hill School, established in 1923 is a smaller preparatory school in Dunbar also providing boarding.

In 2007, Queen Margaret University began its move to a new, purpose-built campus in Musselburgh within East Lothian, providing it with its first university.

Culture and community

Symbols

In November 2017, a county flag competition was launched in East Lothian to register an official flag of East Lothian. Anyone willing to enter this competition was allowed to enter, which resulted in 623 entries to the competition. The end of the entry submission time was the 28th of February 2018. Four final flag designs will be placed in a vote to the residents of East Lothian. In December 2018 the winning design was announced, designed by Archie Martin, a local man from Musselburgh and residing in Gifford who had worked for the council for 23 years. Martin died in July 2018. The flag features a saltire representing East Lothian as the birthplace of Scotland's flag. A gold cross signifies the wealth of East Lothian's farmlands and reputation as the granary of Scotland with a lion in the centre representing the Haddington lion along with blue stripes to represent the rivers Esk and Tyne.

Local media
East Lothian is served by a local paid-for weekly newspapers, the East Lothian Courier.

The East Lothian Courier (often locally "The Courier") began as the Haddingtonshire Courier in 1859, before changing its name in 1971. It was owned by D&J Croal, based in Haddington, until its purchase by the Dunfermline Press Group in 2004. It is now owned by Newsquest

The East Lothian News was first published in 1971, as part of Scottish County Press Group, with editorial offices in Dalkeith and printing at Bonnyrigg (both in Midlothian). The Scottish County Press Group was acquired by Regional Independent Media in 2000, which was in turn bought by Johnston Press in 2002. The East Lothian News closed in 2015.

There are two local community radio stations in East Lothian, broadcasting on FM and online. East Coast FM, based in Haddington, has been broadcasting since 2009. Radio Saltire, formerly East Lothian FM, is now based in Tranent.

Notable people (by date of death)

 Gospatric II, Earl of Lothian, d.1138
 Gospatric III, Earl of Lothian, d.1166
 Waltheof, Earl of Dunbar, d.1182
 Alexander II, King of Scots, 1198–1249
 Black Agnes, 4th Countess of Moray, c.1312-1369
 Abbot Walter Bower, ca.1385–1449, canon regular of Inchcolm Abbey, chronicler, born about at Haddington
 Sawney Bean, cannibal and outlaw, 15th to 16th century
 William Dunbar, medieval poet, 1460–1520
 John Mair or Major, philosopher, 1467–1550
 John Knox, leading Protestant reformer in Scotland and founder of Presbyterianism, c.1510-1572
 John Cockburn of Ormiston, (d.1583) early supporter of the Scottish Reformation
 Ninian Cockburn (d.1579), soldier, an officer of the Garde Écossaise, political intriguer
 Andrew Fletcher of Saltoun (1655–1716), writer, politician, soldier and patriot
 Adam Cockburn, Laird of Ormiston, Lord Ormiston (1656–1735), administrator, politician and judge
 John Cockburn, agricultural improver, 1695–1758
 Andrew Meikle, inventor of the Threshing machine, 1719–1811
 John Brown of Haddington, 1722–1787
 Rev. Dr. John Witherspoon, a signatory to the United States Declaration of Independence, 1723–1794
 George Brodie (1786?-1867), historian
 Robert Cadell (1788–1849), bookseller and publisher, closely associated with Sir Walter Scott
 Robert Moffat 1795–1883, Congregationalist missionary to Africa, and father in law of David Livingstone
 Jane Welsh Carlyle, 1801–1866, letter-writer, and wife of Thomas Carlyle, 1801–1866
 Sir William Fergusson, 1st Baronet, surgeon, 1808–1877
 Samuel Smiles, author of Self-Help, 1812–1904
 Mary Balfour Herbert, watercolour painter, 1817–1893
 Samuel Morison Brown, chemist, poet and essayist, 1817–1856
 John Muir, father of the US National Parks, 1838–1914
 Eleanor Mildred Sidgwick, Principal of Newnham College, 1845–1936
 James Porteous, inventor of the Fresno Scraper, 1848–1922
 Peter Hume Brown, historian, 1849–1918
 Arthur Balfour (1848-1930), Prime Minister, 1902–1905
 Eleanor Mildred Sidgwick (1845-1936), mathematician and co-founder of Newham College, University of Cambridge
 William George Nicholson Geddes 1913–1993, civil engineer
 Maureen Mollie Hunter McIlwraith, commonly known as Mollie Hunter 1922–2012, Scottish writer
 Peter Kerr b.1940, best-selling author of travel books and fiction
 John Bellany, painter, 1942-2013
 Rhona Cameron, comedian and activist, b.1965

A number of sports personalities also have links with East Lothian:

 Willie Anderson, golfer, four times U.S. Open Golf Champion, 1901, 1903–05
 Ian Black, professional footballer
 Callum Booth, professional footballer
 Billy Brown, football coach
 Kenny Miller, professional footballer
 Colin Nish, professional footballer
 Jim Calder rugby union player
 Gary Anderson, Darts player
 Andrew Driver, professional footballer
 Danny Handling, professional footballer
 Jason Holt, Professional footballer
 David Huish, professional golfer
 Allan Jacobsen, rugby union player
 Jim Jefferies, football manager
 John McGlynn, football manager
 Catriona Matthew, golfer
 Mathew Dawson, racehorse trainer
 Euan Burton, judoka and 2012 Olympics contender
 Finlay Calder, rugby union player
 Ross Muir, professional snooker player
 Scott Murray, rugby union player
 Garry O'Connor, professional footballer
 Willie Ormond, footballer and manager
 Jock Taylor, World Champion motorcycle sidecar racer
 Ben Sayers, professional golfer & club maker
 John White, footballer
 Willie Wood (bowler), professional bowler
 Dean Brett, footballer
 Josh Taylor, boxer

Freedom of the County
The following people and military units have received the Freedom of the County of East Lothian.

Individuals
 John Bellany : 2004.
 Catriona Matthew : 2009.

Military Units
 1st Battalion The Royal Scots Borderers: 2012.
 E Squadron The Scottish and North Irish Yeomanry: 6 July 2019.

References

Bibliography

Church and parish histories: Presbytery of Haddington
 The Lamp of Lothian ; or, The History of Haddington. James Miller (new edition, 1900).
 Reminiscences of the Royal Burgh of Haddington. John Martine (1883).
 Reminiscences of the County of Haddington. John Martine (1890).
 Reminiscences of the County of Haddington. Second Series, ed. E. J. Wilson (1895).
 The History of Morham. David Louden (1889).
 North Berwick and its Vicinity. George Ferrier (1875).
 The Bass Rock, its Civil and Ecclesiastical History. Thomas M'Crie, D.D. (1847).
 Emeralds chased in Gold. Rev. John Dickson (1899).
 Prestonpans and Vicinity. P. M'Neill (1902).
 Tranent and its Surroundings. P. M'Neill (1884).
 East Lothian Studies. Louden and Whitfield (1891).
 East Lothian. Charles E. Green (1907).
 Sketches of East Lothian. D. Croal (1873).

Presbytery of Dunbar
 Coldingham: Parish and Priory [notices of Cockburnspath, etc.]. A. Thomson (1908).
 The History of Dunbar. James Miller (1859).
 An Old Kirk Chronicle. Peter Hately Waddell, D.D. (1893).
 The Churches of St Baldred. Rev. A. I. Ritchie (1880).
 Saint Mary's, Whitekirk. Rev. E. B. Rankin (1914).
 History of Berwickshire Naturalists' Club [for Cockburnspath, Oldhamstocks, etc.]

External links 
 
 East Lothian Council official government website
 

 
Counties of Scotland
Lieutenancy areas of Scotland
Council areas of Scotland
Counties of the United Kingdom (1801–1922)